HMS Finwhale (S05) was the fifth Porpoise-class submarine of the Royal Navy. She was launched on 21 July 1959 and first commissioned on 19 August 1960.

Operational service
During her first commission she went further under the ice than any other submarine at the time. She was recommissioned on 27 January 1964. In March 1965 on her second Arctic patrol she further eclipsed her first ice patrol, penetrating 95 miles into the ice.  She was present at Portsmouth Navy Days in 1965 and 1966.

While in the Far East she was fitted with an Oerlikon deck gun.

She was used as a harbour training vessel between 1979 and 1987. She left under tow for scrapping in Spain on 28 March 1988. She has been the only ship of the Royal Navy to be named after the fin whale.

References

Publications
 

 

British Porpoise-class submarines
Ships built on the River Mersey
1959 ships